Diesel (sometimes Diesel Seattle) is a gay bar in Seattle, in the U.S. state of Washington.

History
The bar opened in 2011, catering to the bear community. Mike Reis is a co-owner.

In 2011, Reis was denied service by the printing company Access Printed Media for promoting homosexuality, which the American Civil Liberties Union said violated state law.

Reception
Bryan van Gorder ranked Diesel number 26 on NewNowNext.com's 2018 list of nation's 50 most popular gay bars. Kevin Phinney included Diesel in Metrosource 2019 list of Seattle's best gay bars. He said: 

Robin Gray included Diesel in Bear World magazine's 2019 list of the world's best bear bars. Emma Banks included Diesel in Thrillist's 2021 list of Seattle's best LGBTQ bars, writing: "Diesel claims to be 'fueling Seattle's bear scene,' and while we can't confirm whether or not that's true, it's certainly worth a visit to find out. Here, the booze (and beards) flow, and you're bound to have a good time if you fall into the following categories: 'Bears, bikers, buddies, bubbas, blue collars, and bad asses' (aren't we all?)."

References

External links

 
 

2011 establishments in Washington (state)
Bear (gay culture)
LGBT culture in Seattle
LGBT drinking establishments in Washington (state)